Siddhachal Caves are Jain cave monuments and statues carved into the rock face inside the Urvashi valley of the Gwalior Fort in northern Madhya Pradesh, India. There are the most visited among the five groups of Jain rock carvings on the Gwalior Fort hill. They were built over time starting in the 7th-century, but most are dated to the 15th-century CE. Many of the statues were defaced and destroyed under the orders of the Muslim Emperor Babur of the Mughal dynasty in the 16th century, while a few repaired and restored after the fall of the Mughal dynasty and through the late 19th century.

The statues depict all 24 Tirthankaras. They are shown in both seated Padmasana posture as well as standing Kayotsarga posture, in the typical naked form of Jain iconography. The reliefs behind some of them narrate scenes from the Jain legends.

The Siddhachal Jain collosi cave temple is one of the Archaeological Survey of India's Adarsh Smarak Monument along with other monuments in the Gwalior Fort.

Location 

The Siddhachal collosi cave temples are located inside fortifications of the Urvahi valley, a part of the fort of Gwalior, Madhya Pradesh, immediately below the northwestern walls of the fortress. The Gwalior city and the fort is connected to other Indian cities by major highways NH 44 and 46 (Asian Highway 43 and 47), a railway station and airport (IATA: GWL). It is located near other historic Hindu and Jain temples from the medieval era.

History 

The Siddhachal cave temples are a part of nearly 100 Jain monuments found in and around the Gwalior city, all dated to be from the 7th to 15th century. The Siddachal colossi are near the Urwahi road, and most are dated to be from the 15th century, built in an era when Delhi Sultanate had collapsed and fragmented, a Hindu kingdom was back in power in Gwalior region and before Babur had ended the Delhi Sultanate and replaced it with his Mughal dynasty. The inscriptions found near the monuments credit them to the Tomar kings, and they range from the 1440 to 1453 CE. The Siddhachal Caves were complete by about 1473 CE. Some 60 years after they had been completed, the statues were defaced and desecrated around 1527 when the Emperor Babur ordered their destruction. Babur explained in a memoir,

The Jain cave temples within the Gwalior Fort were, however, not destroyed, just mutilated by chopping off the faces, the sexual organs and their limbs. Centuries later, the Jain community restored many of the statues by adding back stucco heads on the top of the damaged idols.

Description 

The Siddhachal Caves are rock-cut monuments with Jain collosi. They are found on both sides of the slope of the Urwahi road in the fort, along the Urwahi valley. The monuments include many caves, small reliefs on the walls, as well as 22 colossi. Other colossi include a seated  Neminatha (shell icon on his pedestal), Parshvanatha with serpent cover over his head and Mahavira (lion icon on his pedestal).

Gallery

See also
Gwalior Fort
Mewar
Gopachal rock cut Jain monuments

References

Citation

Sources 
 

Jain temples in Madhya Pradesh
7th-century Jain temples
Tourist attractions in Gwalior
Jain rock-cut architecture
Colossal Jain statues in India
Jain caves in India